Gastón Antonio Zapata Velasco (born October 25, 1951) is a Peruvian historian, professor and columnist, known for his investigations and articles about the history and sociopolitical reality of Peru.

Biography 
Son of the director of the Civil Guard, Gastón Zapata de la Flor.

He studied Letters at the Pontificial Catholic University of Peru, after that he obtained a Master of Arts in Latin American History at the Columbia University. He also studied diplomatics in History in the School for Advanced Studies in the Social Sciences from Paris, France.

Back to Columbia University he studied a Master's Degree (Ph.M) and obtained a Doctorate (Ph.D) in Latin American History.

He is professor in the Humanities Department from the Pontificial Catholic University of Peru and from the Social Sciences Department from the National University of San Marcos.

He is columnist for newspaper La Republica and political analyst. He is Research Associate from the Instituto de Estudios Peruanos (IEP), specialized in contemporary history.

He was director and presenter from the history programme "Sucedió en el Perú", from TV Perú.

Publications 

 Cultura, diversidad y conocimientos ante los tratados de libre comercio. Lima: ITACAB, 2005.
 El joven Belaunde: historia de la revista El Arquitecto Peruano, 1937-1963. Lima: Minerva, 1995.
 La crónica del cólera en el Perú. Lima: DESCO, 1991.
 Pensando a la derecha. Lima: Planeta, 2016
 La guerra senderista. Lima: Taurus, 2017

References

External links 

 Antonio Zapata's semanal column in La República.
 Sucedió en el Perú: La Guerra del Pacífico 1879-1883 Sucedió en el Perú: La Guerra del Pacífico 1879-1883

Pontifical Catholic University of Peru alumni
Columbia Graduate School of Arts and Sciences alumni
Academic staff of the National University of San Marcos
Peruvian essayists
Peruvian columnists
20th-century Peruvian historians
21st-century Peruvian historians
1947 births
Peruvian television presenters
Academic staff of the Pontifical Catholic University of Peru
Living people